Penistone was a Parliamentary constituency covering the town of Penistone in Yorkshire and surrounding countryside.  It returned one Member of Parliament (MP) to the House of Commons of the Parliament of the United Kingdom, elected by the first-past-the-post voting system.

History
The constituency was created for the 1918 general election and abolished for the 1983 general election.

Boundaries 
1918–1950: The Urban Districts of Clayton West, Denby and Cumberworth, Gunthwaite and Ingbirchworth, Hoyland Swaine, Kirkburton, Penistone, Shelley, Shepley, Skelmanthorpe, Stocksbridge, and Thurlstone, and the Rural Districts of Penistone and Wortley.

1950–1955: The Urban Districts of Denby Dale, Dodworth, Hoyland Nether, Kirkburton, Penistone, and Stocksbridge, and the Rural Districts of Penistone and Wortley.

1955–1983: The Urban Districts of Dodworth, Hoyland Nether, Penistone, and Stocksbridge, and the Rural Districts of Penistone and Wortley.

The area formerly covered by this constituency was then placed mostly in the Barnsley West and Penistone constituency and partly in the Sheffield Hillsborough constituency.

Following a later boundary review, the Penistone and Stocksbridge constituency which came into force at the 2010 general election roughly covered a similar area to the old Penistone constituency.

Members of Parliament

Election results

Elections in the 1970s

Elections in the 1960s

Elections in the 1950s

Elections in the 1940s

Elections in the 1930s

Elections in the 1920s

Elections in the 1910s

Sources

Richard Kimber's Political Science Resources (Election results since 1951)

Parliamentary constituencies in Yorkshire and the Humber (historic)
Constituencies of the Parliament of the United Kingdom established in 1918
Constituencies of the Parliament of the United Kingdom disestablished in 1983
Politics of Penistone